Chris Rast (born 21 May 1972) is a Swiss-American sailor. He represented Switzerland at the 1996 Summer Olympics and the 2004 Summer Olympics, and the United States at the 2008 Summer Olympics.

References

External links
 

1972 births
Living people
American male sailors (sport)
Swiss male sailors (sport)
Olympic sailors of Switzerland
Olympic sailors of the United States
Sailors at the 1996 Summer Olympics – 470
Sailors at the 2004 Summer Olympics – 49er
Sailors at the 2008 Summer Olympics – 49er
Sportspeople from Columbus, Georgia